Robert Lee Thomas (born August 23, 1948) is a former American football running back in the National Football League who played for the Los Angeles Rams and San Diego Chargers. He played college football for the Arizona State Sun Devils.

References

1948 births
Living people
American football running backs
Los Angeles Rams players
San Diego Chargers players
Arizona State Sun Devils football players